Association for Defending Victims of Terrorism (ADVT NGO)  is a non-governmental, cultural institution, whose members are the families and children of victims of terrorism.

Association for Defending Victims of Terrorism is a place for gathering families of victims of terrorism so that they can share their experiences and relieve their pains and sufferings; it is a forum for classifying the concerns and demands of the families of victims and survivors of terrorist acts. Supporting victims of terrorism and fighting against terrorist groups are on the top of ADVT’s agenda.

ADVT also tries to minimize the number of victims of terrorism and reduce the recruitment efforts of terrorist groups. The Association formulates its activities in both national and international levels. Giving voice to the families of the victims of terrorism and ultimately seeking a world free from terrorism are the aims sought by the Association for Defending Victims of terrorism.

See also
Masoud Alimohammadi
Majid Shahriari
Darioush Rezaeinejad
Mostafa Ahmadi-Roshan
Sadeq Ganji

References

External links 
 Association for Defending Victims of Terrorism 
 Anti-Terrorism Association Blasts US Support for MKO Terrorist Group

Human rights organisations based in Iran